Zenas Clark (1795–1864) was an American politician from New York.

Life
In 1816, he co-founded the first newspaper in Potsdam, the Potsdam Gazette.

He was Supervisor of the Town of Potsdam from 1830 to 1834.

He was a member of the New York State Assembly (St. Lawrence Co.) in 1840 and 1841.

He was a member of the New York State Senate (15th D.) from 1854 to 1857, sitting in the 77th, 78th, 79th and 80th New York State Legislatures. He resigned his seat on February 13, 1857, due to ill health.

He was buried at the Bayside Cemetery in Potsdam.

Sources
The New York Civil List compiled by Franklin Benjamin Hough (pages 137, 139, 224f and 265; Weed, Parsons and Co., 1858)
History of Potsdam transcribed from Our County and Its people: St. Lawrence County, New York by Gates Curtis (1894), at Ray's Place

External links

1795 births
1864 deaths
Democratic Party members of the New York State Assembly
Democratic Party New York (state) state senators
People from Potsdam, New York
19th-century American newspaper editors
19th-century American politicians
Journalists from New York (state)